A malodorant is a chemical compound whose extreme stench acts  as a temporary incapacitant. It attacks the olfactory and/or trigeminal nerves of the person introduced to the chemical. These compounds are usually composed of at least two ingredients: the malodorant compound and a carrier liquid. Malodorant compositions have a toxicity category rating of III or higher.

Compounds used as malodorants
 Organosulfur compounds
 Skatole, an odor intensifier

Common responses to malodorant
 Immediate nausea
 Gagging/vomiting
 Various levels of discomfort

Weapon examples
 Dippel's oil
 Skunk (weapon)
 Who Me

See also
 Stink bomb

References

Non-lethal weapons
Foul-smelling chemicals